Goldwyn Pictures Corporation was an American motion picture production company that operated from 1916 to 1924 when it was merged with two other production companies to form the major studio, Metro-Goldwyn-Mayer. It was founded on November 19, 1916, by Samuel Goldwyn, an executive at Lasky's Feature Play Company (later Paramount Pictures), and Broadway producer brothers Edgar and Archibald Selwyn, using an amalgamation of both last names to name the company.

The studio proved moderately successful, but became most famous due to its iconic Leo the Lion trademark. Although Metro was the nominal survivor, the merged studio inherited Goldwyn's old facility in Culver City, California where it would remain until 1986. The merged studio also retained Goldwyn's Leo the Lion logo.

Lee Shubert of The Shubert Organization was an investor in the company.

History 

Goldwyn had left Lasky's Feature Play Company, of which he was a co-founder, in 1916 when Feature Play merged with Famous Players. Margaret Mayo, Edgar Selwyn's wife and play writer, and Arthur Hopkins, a Broadway producer, joined the trio as writer and director general.

At the beginning, Goldwyn Pictures rented production facilities from Solax Studios when it and many other early film studios in America's first motion picture industry were based in Fort Lee, New Jersey. The company's first release was Polly of the Circus, an adaptation of Mayo's 1907 play of the same name, released in September 1917 and starting Mae Marsh. By April 1917, Goldwyn Pictures agreed to rent the Universal Pictures studios in Fort Lee, then having the second largest stage, and had two film companies operating at the time with plans for more production companies. The company management planned on having 12 films done by September 1, 1917, without distributing the films so as to be able to show advanced footage to the theaters. Goldfish also associated the company with Columbia University via Professor Victor Freeburg's Photoplay Writing class in 1917 to increase the company's artistic standings. The company also released other production companies films with Marie Dressler's Dressler Producing Corporation film, The Scrub Lady, in 1917. The company was forced in October 1917 to switch out The Eternal Magalene for Fighting Odds, both starring Maxine Elliott, after the National Board of Review cleared the Magalene movie while censors in Pennsylvania state and Chicago city did not approve the film. Thais starring Mary Garden was released in late 1917 which was a costly loss.

In January 1918, Goldfish signed director Raoul Walsh and prematurely announced it as there were two years left on Walsh's contract with Fox. With Thais being the company's second costly loss, Goldwyn decreased film budgets partly by not using theater divas to cross over to film and reducing design driven films. Instead, he relied on comedies starring Madge Kennedy and Mabel Normand. In August 1918, Goldwyn Pictures signed Will Rogers, at that time a Broadway Follies favorite, to star in a Rex Beach production, Laughing Bill Hyde, filmed at the Fort Lee studio for release in September. The company purchased the Triangle Studios in Culver City in 1918. Goldwyn then headed west to Culver City, California in 1918; opening operations there also caused an increase in film expenses. Seeing an opportunity in December, Samuel Goldfish then had his name legally changed to Samuel Goldwyn.

In 1919, Frank Joseph "Joe" Godsol became an investor in Goldwyn Pictures. Since 1912 Godsol had been making deals for the Shubert organization in the U.S. and abroad.

Goldwyn began looking to follow other film companies, like Loews Theaters/Metro Pictures and First National, into vertical integration. Goldwyn and the company backers were looking at renting the Astor Theatre for movie premiers. Instead, with the Capitol Theatre's financial problems in May 1920, the backer purchased a controlling interest in that theater. Shubert and Godsol, however, did not want the theater to rely only on Goldwyn films and operated it separately from the company.

By 1920 in addition owning its Culver City studio, Goldwyn Pictures was renting two New York studios and operations in Fort Lee.

After personality clashes, Samuel Goldwyn left the company in 1922. Godsol became Chairman of the Board and President of Goldwyn Pictures in 1922. In 1923 Lee Shubert of Shubert Theater contacted Marcus Loew about merging the company with Loew's Metro. Loew agreed to the merger. Louis B. Mayer heard about the pending merger and contacted Loew and Godsol, about adding his Louis B. Mayer Productions into the post merger company, which became the blockbuster Metro-Goldwyn-Mayer.

Feature staff

Actors 
 Mae Marsh
 Mabel Normand
 Pauline Frederick
 Madge Kennedy
 Tallulah Bankhead
 Will Rogers
 E.K. Lincoln

Directors 
 Raoul Walsh
 Ralph Ince
 Frank Lloyd
 Sidney Olcott

Filmography 

A 1965 fire in an MGM storage facility destroyed many negatives and prints, including the best-quality copies of every Goldwyn picture produced prior to 1924; over half of MGM's feature films from before 1930 are completely lost. On March 25, 1986, Ted Turner and his Turner Broadcasting System company purchased the pre-May 1986 MGM films (including Goldwyn Pictures films) from Kirk Kerkorian for $600 million.

Polly of the Circus (1917)
 Baby Mine (1917)
 Fighting Odds (1917)
 The Spreading Dawn (1917)
 Sunshine Alley (1917)
 Nearly Married (1917)
 The Cinderella Man (1917)
 Thais (1917)
Fields of Honor (1918)
 Dodging a Million (1918)
 Go West, Young Man (1918)
 Our Little Wife (1918)
 The Beloved Traitor (1918)
 The Floor Below (1918)
 The Splendid Sinner (1918)
 The Face in the Dark (1918)
 The Danger Game (1918)
 Joan of Plattsburg (1918)
 The Fair Pretender (1918)
 All Woman (1918)
 The Venus Model (1918)
 The Service Star (1918)
 The Glorious Adventure (1918)
 Back to the Woods (1918)
 The Border Legion (1918)
 Friend Husband (1918)
 Money Mad (1918)
 The Turn of the Wheel (1918)
 Peck's Bad Girl (1918)
 Just for Tonight (1918)
 The Kingdom of Youth (1918)
 Hidden Fires (1918)
 Thirty a Week (1918)
 A Perfect 36 (1918)
 The Hell Cat (1918)
 A Perfect Lady (1918)
 The Racing Strain (1918)
 Day Dreams (1919)
 The Bondage of Barbara (1919)
 Shadows (1919)
 The Woman on the Index (1919)
 Sis Hopkins (1919)
 Daughter of Mine (1919)
 Spotlight Sadie (1919)
 A Man and His Money (1919)
 The Pest (1919)
 The Eternal Magdalene (1919)
 The Stronger Vow (1919)
 One Week of Life (1919)
 Leave It to Susan (1919)
 When Doctors Disagree (1919)
 One of the Finest (1919)
 The Fear Woman (1919)
 The Crimson Gardenia (1919)
 The City of Comrades (1919)
 Through the Wrong Door (1919)
 Upstairs (1919)
 The Peace of Roaring River (1919)
 Heartsease (1919)
 Lord and Lady Algy (1919)
 The World and Its Woman (1919)
 Strictly Confidential (1919)
 Almost a Husband (1919)
 Flame of the Desert (1919)
 Bonds of Love (1919)
 Jubilo (1919)
 The Loves of Letty (1919)
 Jinx (1919)
 Toby's Bow (1919)
 The Gay Lord Quex (1919)
 Pinto (1920)
 Water, Water, Everywhere (1920)
 The Blooming Angel (1920)
 The Paliser Case (1920)
 Duds (1920)
 The Little Shepherd of Kingdom Come (1920)
 The Woman and the Puppet (1920)
 The Strange Boarder (1920)
 The Woman in Room 13 (1920)
 Jes' Call Me Jim (1920)
 Dollars and Sense (1920)
 A Double-Dyed Deceiver (1920)
 The Great Accident (1920)
 Cupid the Cowpuncher (1920)
 The Penalty (1920)
 The Slim Princess (1920)
 Earthbound (1920)
 The Truth (1920)
 Stop Thief (1920)
 Milestones (1920)
 Honest Hutch (1920)
 Madame X (1920)
 Officer 666 (1920)
 The Man Who Had Everything (1920)
 Just Out of College (1920)
 The Great Lover (1920)
 Guile of Women (1920)
 What Happened to Rosa (1920)
 Help Yourself (1920)
 Bunty Pulls the Strings (1921)
 The Girl with the Jazz Heart (1921)
 Hold Your Horses (1921)
 The Highest Bidder (1921)
 The Concert (1921)
 Boys Will Be Boys (1921)
 For Those We Love (1921)
 A Tale of Two Worlds (1921)
 Roads of Destiny (1921)
 The Cabinet of Dr. Caligari (1921, originally released in 1920 in Germany)
 An Unwilling Hero (1921)
 Snowblind (1921)
 Made in Heaven (1921)
 A Voice in the Dark (1921)
 The Old Nest (1921)
 Don't Neglect Your Wife (1921)
 Oh Mary Be Careful (1921)
 The Ace of Hearts (1921)
 All's Fair in Love (1921)
 Beating the Game (1921)
 Dangerous Curve Ahead (1921)
 Doubling for Romeo (1921)
 The Invisible Power (1921)
 The Grim Comedian (1921)
 The Man from Lost River (1921)
 Pardon My French (1921)
 The Poverty of Riches (1921)
 From the Ground Up (1921)
 A Poor Relation (1921)
 Voices of the City (1921)
 Grand Larceny (1922)
 Man with Two Mothers (1922)
 Watch Your Step (1922)
 Sherlock Holmes (1922)
 Come on Over (1922)
 When Romance Rides (1922)
 Head over Heels (1922)
 Yellow Men and Gold (1922)
 His Back Against the Wall (1922)
 Mr. Barnes of New York (1922)
 The Wall Flower (1922)
 The Strangers' Banquet (1922)
 Dust Flower (1922)
 Remembrance (1922)
 The Sin Flood (1922)
 Brothers Under the Skin (1922)
 Hungry Hearts (1922)
 A Blind Bargain (1922) (considered lost)
 Broken Chains (1922)
 The Glorious Fool (1922)
 The Christian (1923)
 Little Old New York (1923)
 Gimme (1923)
 Look Your Best (1923)
 Unseeing Eyes (1923)
 Under the Red Robe (1923)
 The Love Piker (1923)
 Lost and Found on a South Sea Island (1923)
 Vanity Fair (1923)
 Souls for Sale (1923)
 Three Wise Fools (1923)
 The Spoilers (1923)
 Red Lights (1923)
 Six Days (1923)
 Dr. Sunshine (1923)
 The Eternal Three (1923)
 The Steadfast Heart (1923)
 Slave of Desire (1923)
 The Last Moment (1923)
 The Day of Faith (1923)
 The Green Goddess (1923)
 In the Palace of the King (1923)
 The Rendezvous (1923)
 Reno (1923)
 The Ragged Edge (1923)
 Wild Oranges (1924)
 Name the Man (1924)
 Through the Dark (1924)
 Second Youth (1924)
 Three Weeks (1924)
 Nellie, the Beautiful Cloak Model (1924)
 True as Steel (1924)
 The Rejected Woman (1924)
 The Recoil (1924)
 Tarnish (1924)

See also 
 Samuel Goldwyn Productions, Samuel Goldwyn's next production company
 Samuel Goldwyn Studio, informal name for the Pickford-Fairbanks Studios lot in Hollywood.
 The Samuel Goldwyn Company, founded by Samuel Goldwyn, Jr. in 1979, active through 1997
 Samuel Goldwyn Films, founded by Samuel Goldwyn, Jr.

References

External links 

 American Film Institute Catalog
 Goldwyn Pictures Corp.
 Goldwyn Distributing Corp.
 Silent Era.com
 Goldwyn Distributing Corporation
 Goldwyn Pictures Corporation
 Goldwyn Producing Corporation

Mass media companies established in 1916
Mass media companies disestablished in 1924
Silent film studios

Defunct American film studios
Cinema of Southern California
Companies based in Culver City, California
.
1916 establishments in New Jersey
1916 establishments in California
1924 disestablishments in California
Film production companies of the United States
1924 mergers and acquisitions
Fort Lee, New Jersey
Companies based in Bergen County, New Jersey